The Lost Lake Trail near Estes Park, Colorado, also known as, or including, Sawmill Trail, is a  trail through what is now Roosevelt National Forest and then through what is now Rocky Mountain National Park (RMNP).

The trail was built in 1934.  It was designed by Allison van V. Dunn of the National Park Service.

The 4.5-mile portion of the trail within RMNP was listed on the National Register of Historic Places in 2008.  The listing included  and a contributing structure having Late 19th and Early 20th Century American Movements and Rustic architecture.

References

Park buildings and structures on the National Register of Historic Places in Colorado
Late 19th and Early 20th Century American Movements architecture
Buildings and structures completed in 1934
Transportation in Larimer County, Colorado
Roosevelt National Forest
National Register of Historic Places in Rocky Mountain National Park
National Register of Historic Places in Larimer County, Colorado
1934 establishments in Colorado